Adolph Meyer (October 19, 1842 – March 8, 1908) was a member of the U. S. House of Representatives representing the state of Louisiana. He served nine terms as a Democrat from 1891 until his death in office in 1908.

Biography
Meyer was born in to a Jewish family of German descent in Natchez, Mississippi.

During the Civil War, Meyer served in the Confederate Army on the staff of Brigadier General John Stuart Williams of Kentucky and attained the rank of assistant adjutant general. A planter in Mississippi and a banker in New Orleans, he served in the Louisiana National Guard, attaining the rank of brigadier general in 1881.

Namesakes

General Meyer Avenue in the Algiers neighborhood in New Orleans is named in his honor for his efforts in lobbying for a U.S. Naval Yard in that area. The Avenue begins as Newton Street in Algiers Point, changes name to General Meyer Avenue at Behrman Avenue, and continues for approximately 4 miles, ending at Bennett Street in the Lower Algiers neighborhood.

The Adolph Meyer School (1917) was a school in Algiers on General Meyer Avenue;  renamed to honor Harriet Tubman in the 1990s, the facility operates today as Harriet Tubman Charter School, one of Crescent City Schools' three charter elementary schools.  In 2016, the building was listed on the National Register of Historic Places. It is located at the southeast corner of General Meyer and Behrman, across from the U.S. Naval Station Algiers Historic District and the city's Federal City complex.

See also
 
List of Jewish members of the United States Congress
List of United States Congress members who died in office (1900–49)

References

External links

Adolph Meyer, late a representative from Louisiana, Memorial addresses delivered in the House of Representatives and Senate frontispiece 1909

1842 births
1908 deaths
Jewish American military personnel
American people of German-Jewish descent
American planters
Jewish Confederates
Jewish American bankers
Jewish members of the United States House of Representatives
Confederate States Army officers
People of Louisiana in the American Civil War
19th-century American politicians
National Guard (United States) generals
Democratic Party members of the United States House of Representatives from Louisiana